Cyclophora imperialis is a moth in the  family Geometridae. It is found in Somalia.

References

Endemic fauna of Somalia
Moths described in 1937
Cyclophora (moth)
Fauna of Somalia
Moths of Africa